Ricardo Guillén Mendoza (born 17 June 1976, in Santa Cruz de Tenerife, Canary Islands, Spain) is a Spanish basketball player. He currently plays as a power forward at CB Marbella La Cañada in Liga EBA.

After seven seasons in LEB Oro, he is the top scorer in the history of the league.

Playing career
In 2012, Guillén won with Iberostar Canarias the Copa Príncipe and the LEB Oro, achieving the promotion to Liga ACB.

Guillén announced his retirement on 3 November 2016.

However, he continued playing as amateur player in the fifth tier with CB Marbella, achieving promotion to Liga EBA.

Achievements

With Unicaja
ACB runner-up (1994–95)

With Spain national youth teams
Bronze medal in 1994 U-18 Eurobasket
Bronze medal in 1995 U-19 WBC
Silver medal in 1996 U-20 Eurobasket

References

External links 
 Ricardo Guillén at ACB.com
 Ricardo Guillén at FEB.es

1976 births
Living people
Baloncesto Málaga players
Sportspeople from Santa Cruz de Tenerife
CB Axarquía players
CB Canarias players
CB Granada players
CB Gran Canaria players
Gijón Baloncesto players
Liga ACB players
Obradoiro CAB players
Power forwards (basketball)
Spanish men's basketball players
Tenerife CB players